William Ralph Johnson  (born 3 June 1948) is a retired British international fencer.

Fencing career
He competed at the 1968, 1972, 1976 and 1984 Summer Olympics. He represented England and won a gold medal in the épée team event, at the 1970 British Commonwealth Games in Edinburgh, Scotland.

He was a six times British fencing champion, winning the épée title at the British Fencing Championships in 1968, 1982, 1984, 1985, 1987 and 1990.

References

1948 births
Living people
British male fencers
Olympic fencers of Great Britain
Fencers at the 1968 Summer Olympics
Fencers at the 1972 Summer Olympics
Fencers at the 1976 Summer Olympics
Fencers at the 1984 Summer Olympics
Sportspeople from London
Commonwealth Games medallists in fencing
Commonwealth Games gold medallists for England
Fencers at the 1970 British Commonwealth Games
Medallists at the 1970 British Commonwealth Games